Serge Petrovitch Ivanoff (25 December 1893, Moscow – 8 February 1983, Paris) was a Russian painter.

Biography 

The son of a family of Moscovite merchants, Serge Ivanoff was artistic from a young age. On his parents' move to St. Petersburg he took the opportunity for further studies, and contact with Europe. In 1917, while the Russian Revolution raged, he entered what was then the Higher Arts College of Painting, Sculpture and Architecture at the Imperial Academy of Arts (which was to become, by 1992, the I.E. Repin St. Petersburg State Academic Institute of Painting, Sculpture and Architecture,
subordinated within the Russian Academy of Arts).
In 1920, his wife, with their two children, fled the Bolsheviks to Paris. Two years later, having finished his studies and forever marked by the horrors of the revolution, Serge joined them in Paris.

A talented portraitist, he executed the portraits of many personalities, among which were the Pope Pius XI, Serge Lifar, Yvette Chauviré, Arthur Honegger, Edwige Feuillère, Vladimir Kirillovich, Grand Duke of Russia, Princess Vassili, Aleksandr Benois, Zinaida Serebriakova, Vyacheslav Ivanov, Alexandre Barbera-Ivanoff, Paul Valéry, Jacques Fath, Eleanor Roosevelt, Jefferson Caffery. Among the lesser known, Ivanoff also painted: the sculptor François Cogné (Cogné, in French), American designer and artist Irina Belotelkin, and art supply merchant Herman Flax.

In 1950, Ivanoff moved to the United States; one year later he became an honorary citizen. For over a decade he traveled across the American continent, executing many portraits. At the end of the 1960s, he returned to France. He was a member of the Salon des Indépendants. In 1966, France's first Minister of Cultural Affairs, André Malraux, awarded him a gold medal.

References 

The French-language version of this page (Serge Ivanoff) with adjustments (see Talk:Serge Ivanoff).

External links 

 Website of the painter.
 Saint Petersburg Encyclopaedia

Artists from Moscow
1893 births
1983 deaths
20th-century Russian painters
Russian male painters
20th-century Russian male artists
White Russian emigrants to France